Percy Learns to Waltz is a 1912 American silent comedy film starring John R. Cumpson. It was produced by the Independent Moving Pictures (IMP) Company of New York.

Cast
 John R. Cumpson	
 Frank Russell	Frank Russell	
 Frank Hall Crane	
 Hayward Mack	
 Walter Long	
 Rogers J.R.	
 William Cunningham

External links
 

1912 films
Silent American comedy films
American silent short films
American black-and-white films
1912 short films
1912 comedy films
American comedy short films
1910s dance films
Films directed by William Robert Daly
1910s American films